NWEA, formerly known as the Northwest Evaluation Association, is a research-based not-for-profit organization that creates academic assessments for students pre-K-12. NWEA assessments are used by over 9,500 schools and districts in 145 countries. Its primary assessment product is the MAP Suite, a collection of formative and interim assessments that help teachers identify unique student learning needs, track skill mastery, and measure academic growth over time. By testing students three times over the school year, MAP assessments attempt to track student growth over time in order to help educators plan curriculum that matches a student’s ability, and provides a method of visualizing the student’s educational progression.

In January 2023, it was announced that Houghton Mifflin Harcourt had acquired NWEA and would operate as a division of HMH.

References

Standardized tests in the United States